The 2022 London municipal election was a municipal election that occurred on October 24, 2022, in conjunction with municipal elections being held across the province.

Electoral system
After using ranked ballots in the 2018 municipal election, London will return to using the first past the post electoral system after the passing of the Supporting Ontario's Recovery and Municipal Elections Act, 2020 by the Government of Ontario, which removed the right of municipalities to use a different electoral system from FPTP.

The candidates registered to run for London City Council are as follows:

Mayor
Incumbent mayor Ed Holder will not run for a second term, announcing on May 24 that he was retiring from politics. Two days later, deputy mayor Josh Morgan announced he was running for the position. He was endorsed by Holder. On June 27, former Liberal MPP Khalil Ramal announced he would be running for mayor. On the final day of registration, August 19, well-known local pastor Sandie Thomas entered the race.

London City Council

Ward 1

Ward 2

Ward 3

Ward 4

Ward 5

Ward 6

Ward 7

Ward 8

Ward 9

Ward 10

Ward 11

Ward 12

Ward 13

Ward 14

References

London
Municipal elections in London, Ontario